Gregory Brian Leisz (born September 18, 1949) is an American musician. He is a songwriter, recording artist, and producer. He plays guitar, dobro, mandolin, lap steel and pedal steel guitar.

Biography

Leisz grew up in the garage band culture of mid-1960s Southern California. He spent time at the Ashgrove, the Troubador, and clubs on the Sunset Strip . He began playing guitar and soon added dobro and lap steel. He was inspired to pick up the pedal steel after hearing Sneaky Pete Kleinow and Buddy Emmons. In 1975, he toured with John Stewart (formerly of The Kingston Trio). He was a member of Funky Kings who released their eponymous debut album on Arista Records in 1976. After the band broke up, he became a popular musician both in the studio and on the road.

In 1987, Leisz began working with Dave Alvin (formerly of The Blasters). Their collaboration led to Leisz producing several of Alvin's albums, including King of California, Black Jack David, Ashgrove, and West of the West. In 1989, he played on k.d. lang's Grammy-winning Absolute Torch and Twang and joined her on the resulting tour. For the next eighteen years he toured with Lang and recorded with her, including her album Ingenue. Starting the early 1990s, he worked often with Matthew Sweet, played on Sweet's album Girlfriend and toured with him.

In January 2008, Leisz joined the group Works Progress Administration, a band composed of Leisz, Sean Watkins (guitar), his sister Sara Watkins (fiddle), Glen Phillips (guitar, vocals), Benmont Tench (piano), Luke Bulla (fiddle), Pete Thomas (drums), and Davey Faragher (bass). The group released their debut album, WPA, on September 15, 2009.

In 2010 and 2011, Leisz toured with Ray LaMontagne as a member of his backing band, The Pariah Dogs. He toured in 2013 as a member of Eric Clapton's band, in 2015 as a member of Jackson Browne's band, and again in 2017. He appeared in the 2016 Cameron Crowe cable television series Roadies, accompanying Jackson Browne on three songs in the last episode of the series.

Leisz's playing has appeared throughout the years on recordings by Aaron Neville, Alison Krauss, Amos Lee, Beck, Bill Frisell, Black Crowes, Bon Iver, Bruce Cockburn, Bruce Springsteen, Cass McCombs, Chuck Prophet, Daft Punk, Dave Alvin, Eagles, Emmylou Harris, Eric Clapton, Glenn Frey, Grant Lee Buffalo, Haim, Jackson Browne, Joe Cocker, John Fogerty, John Mayer, John Stewart, Joni Mitchell, k.d. lang, Lucinda Williams, Matthew Sweet, Meshell Ndegeocello, Paula Cole, Peter Case, Ray Lamontagne, Robert Plant, Rosie Flores, Ryan Adams, Sam Phillips, Sara Watkins, Shawn Colvin, Sheryl Crow, Susanna Hoffs, The Bangles, The Jayhawks, The Smashing Pumpkins, Tracy Chapman, Vampire Weekend, Whiskeytown, Wilco, and Allen Toussaint.

Another close collaborator is Bill Frisell, with whom he tours regularly and is featured on the albums Good Dog, Happy Man, Blues Dream, The Intercontinentals, Disfarmer, All We Are Saying, and Guitar in the Space Age!.

Personal life
Greg married Estonian musician Mai Leisz in April 2018.

Awards

In 2010, Leisz was presented with a Lifetime Achievement Award for Instrumentalist by the Americana Music Association.

In 2011 he received a Grammy Award for Best Contemporary Folk Album for his contributions to Ray LaMontagne's  album God Willin' & the Creek Don't Rise (2010).

Discography
With Ryan Adams
 Demolition (Lost Highway Records, 2002)
 Love Is Hell (Lost Highway Records, 2004)
 Ashes & Fire (Capitol Records, 2011)

With Gregg Allman
 Southern Blood (Rounder Records, 2017)

With David Baerwald
 Bedtime Stories (A&M Records, 1990)

With Jessie Baylin
 Little Spark (Blonde Rat, 2012)

With Beck
 Odelay (DGC, 1996)
 Mutations (DGC, 1998)
 Morning Phase (Capitol Records, 2014)

With Jackson Browne
 The Naked Ride Home (Elektra Records, 2002)
 Standing in the Breach (Inside Recordings, 2014)
 Downhill from Everywhere (Inside Recordings, 2021)

With Peter Case
 Torn Again (Vanguard Records, 1995)
 Full Service No Waiting (Vanguard Records, 1998)
 Flying Saucer Blues (Vanguard Records, 2000)
 Who's Gonna Go Your Crooked Mile? (Vanguard Records, 2004)

With Eric Clapton
 Clapton (Reprise Records, 2010)
 Old Sock (Surfdog Records, 2013)

With Joe Cocker
 Organic (550 Music, 1996)
 Hymn for My Soul (EMI, 2007)

With Holly Cole
 Dark Dear Heart (Alert Records, 1997)
 Night (Universal Music, 2012)

With Shawn Colvin
 Fat City (Columbia Records, 1992)
 These Four Walls (Nonesuch Records, 2006)

With Sheryl Crow
 The Globe Sessions (A&M Records, 1998)
 Wildflower (A&M Records, 2005)

With Lana Del Rey
 Blue Banisters (Polydor Records, 2021)

With Brett Dennen
 So Much More (Dualtone, 2006)

With Tim Easton
 Break Your Mother's Heart (New West Records, 2003)

With Bill Frisell
 Good Dog, Happy Man (Nonesuch Records, 1999)
 Blues Dream (Nonesuch Records, 2001)
 The Intercontinentals (Nonesuch Records, 2003)
 Disfarmer (Nonesuch Records, 2009)
 All We Are Saying (Savoy Jazz, 2011)
 Guitar in the Space Age! (OKeh Records, 2014)

With Barry Gibb
 In the Now (Columbia Records, 2016)

With Gratitude
 Gratitude (Atlantic Records, 2005)

With Michael Grimm
 Michael Grimm (Epic Records, 2011)

With John Wesley Harding
 Why We Fight (Sire, 1992)
 John Wesley Harding's New Deal (Forward, 1996)

With Emmylou Harris and Linda Ronstadt
 Western Wall: The Tucson Sessions (Asylum Records, 1999)

With Emmylou Harris
 All I Intended to Be (Nonesuch Records, 2008)

With Mark Heard
 Second Hand (Fingerprint Records, 1991)

With Taylor Hicks
 Taylor Hicks (Arista Records, 2006)

With Missy Higgins
 The Sound of White (Eleven, 2004)
 On a Clear Night (Eleven, 2007)

With Steve Holy
 Brand New Girlfriend (Curb Records, 2006)

With Miranda Lambert
 Revolution (Columbia Records, 2009)
 Four the Record (RCA Records, 2011)
 Platinum (RCA Records, 2014)

With k.d. lang
 Shadowland (Sire Records, 1988)
 Absolute Torch and Twang (Warner Bros. Records, 1989)
 Ingenue (Warner Bros. Records, 1992)
 Drag (Warner Bros. Records, 1997)
 Invincible Summer (Warner Bros. Records, 2000)
 Watershed (Nonesuch Records, 2008)

With Amos Lee
 Supply and Demand (Blue Note Records, 2006)
 Last Days at the Lodge (Blue Note Records, 2008)
 Mission Bell (Blue Note Records, 2011)
 As the Crow Flies (Blue Note Records, 2012)
 My New Moon (Dualtone Records, 2018)

With Lori Lieberman
 Monterey (Drive On Records, 2003)

With Charles Lloyd
 I Long to See You (Blue Note Records, 2016)
 Vanished Gardens (Blue Note Records, 2018) featuring Lucinda Williams

With John Mayer
 Heavier Things (Aware Records, 2003)
 Born and Raised (Columbia Records, 2012)
 The Search for Everything (Columbia Records, 2017)
 Sob Rock (Columbia Records, 2021)

With Joni Mitchell
 Turbulent Indigo (Reprise Records, 1994)
 Taming the Tiger (Reprise Records, 1997)
 Shine (Hear Music, 2007)

With Gaby Moreno
 Alegoría (Metamorfosis, 2022)

With Geoff Muldaur
 Password (HighTone, 2000)

With The Murmurs
 Pristine Smut (MCA Records, 1997)
 Blender (MCA Records, 1998)

With Anne Murray
 Anne Murray (EMI, 1996)

With Randy Newman
 Bad Love (DreamWorks Pictures, 1999)
 Harps and Angels (Nonesuch Records, 2008)

With Mark Olson
 My Own Jo Ellen (HighTone Records, 2000)
 The Salvation Blues (Hacktone, 2007)

With Judith Owen
 Lost And Found (Century of Progress, 2005)
 Somebody's Child (Twanky Records, 2016)

With Sam Phillips
 Omnipop (It's Only a Flesh Wound Lambchop) (Virgin Records, 1996)
 Cameras in the Sky (Littlebox Recordings, 2011)

With Tristan Prettyman
 Cedar + Gold (Capitol Records, 2012)

With Chuck Prophet
 Balinese Dancer (China Records, 1993)
 Homemade Blood (Cooking Vinyl Records, 1997)
 No Other Love (New West Records, 2002)
 ¡Let Freedom Ring! (Yep, 2009)

With Joshua Radin
 Simple Times (Mom + Pop, 2008)

With Ronna Reeves
 After the Dance (River, 1995)

With Shivaree
 I Oughtta Give You a Shot in the Head for Making Me Live in This Dump (Capitol Records, 1999)

With Michelle Shocked
 Got No Strings (Mighty Sound, 2005)

With Bruce Springsteen
 Wrecking Ball (Columbia Records, 2012)
 Western Stars (Columbia Records, 2019)

With Curtis Stigers
 Brighter Days (Columbia Records, 1999)

With Syd Straw
 Surprise (Virgin Records, 1989)

With Matthew Sweet
 Girlfriend (Zoo, 1991)
 100% Fun (Zoo, 1995)
 In Reverse (Volcano, 1999)
 Kimi Ga Suki (RCAM, 2003)
 Living Things (RCAM, 2004)
 Sunshine Lies (Shout! Factory, 2008)

With Matthew Sweet and Susanna Hoffs
 Under the Covers, Vol. 1 (Shout! Factory, 2006)
 Under the Covers, Vol. 2 (Shout! Factory, 2009)

With The Manhattan Transfer
 The Spirit of St. Louis (Atlantic, 2000)

With various artists
 A Testimonial Dinner: The Songs of XTC (Thirsty Ear Recordings, 1995)
 Songs of Anarchy: Music from Sons of Anarchy Seasons 1–4 (Columbia Records, 2011)
 Sons of Anarchy: Songs of Anarchy Vol. 2 (Columbia, 2012)
 We Walk the Line: A Celebration of the Music of Johnny Cash (Legacy, 2012)

With Loudon Wainwright III
 Here Come the Choppers (Sovereign, 2005)
 Recovery (Yep Roc, 2008)

With Wilco
 Being There (Reprise)
 Alpha Mike Foxtrot: Rare Tracks 1994–2014 (Nonesuch)

With Lucinda Williams
 Car Wheels on a Gravel Road (Mercury, 1998)
 Down Where the Spirit Meets the Bone (Highway 20, 2014)
 The Ghosts of Highway 20 (Highway 20, 2016)

With others
 Amy Allison, Sad Girl (Diesel Only, 2001)
 Amy Allison, Sheffield Streets (Urban Myth, 2009)
 Mose Allison, The Way of the World (Anti-, 2010)
 Dave Alvin, Out in California (HighTone Records, 2002)
 Anjani, Blue Alert (Columbia Records, 2006)
 Fiona Apple, Tidal (Clean Slate, 1996)
 Jann Arden, Happy (A&M Records, 1997)
 Tiger Army, Tiger Army (Hellcat Records, 1999) 
 Tiger Army, V •••– (Rise Records, 2016)
 Steve Azar, Heartbreak Town (River North, 1996)
 Joan Baez, Whistle Down the Wind (Proper Records, 2018)
 The Bangles, Doll Revolution (E1 Music, 2003)
 The Bangles, Sweetheart of the Sun (Model Music Group, 2011)
 Bash & Pop, Friday Night is Killing Me (Sire, 1993)
 The Beach Boys, Stars and Stripes Vol. 1 (River North, 1996)
 Bonnie "Prince" Billy, Beware (Drag City, 2009)
 Mary Black, Shine (Dara, 1997)
 Chris Botti, Slowing Down the World (GRP, 1999)
 Michelle Branch, Everything Comes and Goes (Reprise Records, 2010)
 Phoebe Bridgers, Stranger in the Alps (Dead Oceans, 2017)
 Jon Brion, Meaningless (Straight to Cut Out, 2001)
 Jonatha Brooke, The Works (Bad Dog, 2008)
 Wolf Bros, Live in Colorado (Third Man, 2022)
 Wolf Bros, Live in Colorado Vol. 2 (Third Man, 2022)
 T Bone Burnett, Tooth of Crime (Nonesuch Records, 2008)
 Carlene Carter, Carter Girl (Rounder, 2014)
 Tracy Chapman, Let It Rain (Elektra Records, 2002)
 Bruce Cockburn, Dart to the Heart (True North, 1994)
 Adam Cohen, Adam Cohen (Columbia Records, 1998)
 Paula Cole, This Fire (Imago, 1996)
 Paula Cole, Amen (Imago, 1999)
 Paula Cole, Courage (Decca, 2007)
 Marshall Crenshaw, Life's Too Short (MCA Records, 1991)
 Marshall Crenshaw, Miracle of Science (Razor & Tie, 1996)
 Marshall Crenshaw, 447 (Razor & Tie, 1999)
 Marshall Crenshaw, What's In The Bag? (Razor & Tie, 2003)
 Marshall Crenshaw, Jaggedland (429 Records, 2009)
 A. J. Croce, Adrian James Croce (Seedling, 2004)
 A. J. Croce, Cage of Muses (Seidling, 2009)
 David Crosby, Sky Trails (BMG, 2017)
 David Crosby, For Free (BMG, 2021)
 Crowded House, Intriguer (Fantasy, 2010)
 Rodney Crowell, Sex & Gasoline (Work Song, 2008)
 Velvet Crush, Teenage Symphonies to God (Creation/Sony, 1994)
 Ilse DeLange, The Great Escape (Universal Music, 2006)
 Grey DeLisle, The Graceful Ghost (Sugar Hill, 2004)
 Grey DeLisle, Iron Flowers (Sugar Hill, 2005)
 Neil Diamond, Melody Road (Capitol Records, 2014)
 Jakob Dylan, Women + Country (Columbia, 2010)
 Ramblin' Jack Elliott, A Stranger Here (ANTI, 2009)
 Eagles, Long Road Out of Eden (Lost Highway, 2007)
 Melissa Etheridge, Breakdown (Island Records, 1999)
 Don Felder, Road to Forever (Top Ten, 2012)
 Don Felder, American Rock 'n' Roll (BMG, 2019)
 Brandon Flowers, The Desired Effect (Island Records, 2015)
 John Fogerty, The Blue Ridge Rangers Rides Again (Fortunate Son, 2009)
 John Fogerty, Wrote a Song for Everyone (Vanguard Records, 2013)
 Julia Fordham, Falling Forward (Virgin Records, 1994)
 Glenn Frey, After Hours (Universal Music, 2012)
 Lisa Germano, Magic Neighbor (Young God, 2009)
 Amy Grant, Behind the Eyes (A&M Records, 1997)
 Amy Grant, Somewhere Down the Road (Sparrow Records, 2010)
 Indigo Girls, Despite Our Differences (Hollywood, 2006)
 Haim, Days Are Gone (Polydor, 2013)
 Ben Harper, Diamonds On the Inside (Virgin, 2003)
 Beth Hart, Leave the Light On (Warner Bros. Records, 2003)
 Ted Hawkins, The Next Hundred Years (Geffen, 1994)
 Natalie Hemby, Puxico (GetWrucke, 2017)
 Natalie Hemby, Pins and Needles (Fantasy Records, 2021)
 Joe Henry, Civilians (ANTI, 2007)
 Joe Henry, Invisible Hour (ANTI, 2014)
 Highway 101, Paint the Town (Warner Bros. Records, 1989)
 Susanna Hoffs, Susanna Hoffs (London, 1996)
 Court Yard Hounds, Court Yard Hounds (Columbia Records, 2010)
 Jesca Hoop, Memories Are Now (Sub Pop, 2016)
 Niall Horan, Flicker (Capitol Records, 2017)
 James Iha, Let It Come Down (Virgin, 1998)
 Bon Iver, Bon Iver, Bon Iver (Jagjauwar, 2011)
 Jayhawks, Tomorrow the Green Grass (American, 1995)
 Courtney Jaye, Love and Forgiveness (Not On Label, 2013)
 Jorma Kaukonen, Stars in My Crown (Red House, 2007)
 Funky Kings, Funky Kings (Arista Records, 1976)
 Dave Koz, Off the Beaten Path (Capitol, 1996)
 Alison Krauss, Windy City (Capitol, 2017)
 Ray LaMontagne, God Willin' & the Creek Don't Rise (RCA Records, 2010)
 Jim Lauderdale, Pretty Close to the Truth (Atlantic Records, 1994)
 Jim Lauderdale, Every Second Counts (Atlantic Records, 1995)
 Hugh Laurie, Didn't It Rain (Warner Bros. Records, 2013)
 Hamilton Leithauser + Rostam, I Had a Dream That You Were Mine (Glassnote Records, 2016)
 Dayna Manning, Shades (EMI Canada, 2002)
 Shannon McNally, Jukebox Sparrows (Capitol Records, 2002)
 Shannon McNally, Geronimo (Black Porch Records, 2005)
 Brian McKnight, Back at One (Motown, 1999)
 Christy McWilson, The Lucky One (HighTone, 2000)
 Natalie Merchant, Motherland (Elektra Records, 2001)
 Tift Merritt, See You on the Moon (Fantasy, 2010)
 Ramsay Midwood, Popular Delusions & The Madness of Cows (Farmwire, 2006)
 Keb' Mo', The Door (Epic Records, 2000)
 Keb' Mo', Big Wide Grin (Sony, 2001)
 Keb' Mo', Suitcase (Epic Records, 2006)
 Meshell Ndegeocello, Bitter (Maverick, 1999)
 Willie Nelson, The Great Divide (Lost Highway Records, 2002)
 Willie Nelson, Heroes (Legacy, 2012)
 Aaron Neville, I Know I've Been Changed (EMI, 2010)
 Aaron Neville, My True Story (Blue Note, 2012)
 Nick 13, Nick 13 (Sugar Hill, 2011)
 Stevie Nicks, In Your Dreams (Reprise, 2011)
 Peter Ostroushko, Coming Down from Red Lodge (Red House, 2003)
 Richard Page, Peculiar Life (Little Dume, 2010)
 Madeleine Peyroux, Half the Perfect World (Rounder, 2006)
 Grant Lee Phillips, Virginia Creeper (Zoë, 2004)
 Rebecca Pidgeon, Behind the Velvet Curtain: Songs from the Motion Picture Redbelt (Great American Music, 2008)
 Robert Plant and Alison Krauss, Raising Sand (Rounder, 2007)
 Lisa Marie Presley, Storm & Grace (Universal Republic, 2012)
 Daft Punk, Random Access Memories (Columbia Records, 2013)
 Bonnie Raitt, Slipstream (Redwing, 2012)
 Bonnie Raitt, Dig In Deep (Redwing Records, 2016)
 Carrie Rodriguez, Seven Angels on a Bicycle (Back Porch, 2006)
 Carrie Rodriguez, Love and Circumstance (Ninth Street Opus, 2010)
 Roxette, Tourism (EMI, 1992)
 Leon Russell, Life Journey (Universal Records, 2014)
 Katey Sagal, Covered (eOne, 2013)
 Adam Sandler, What's Your Name? (Warner Bros. Records, 1997)
 Timothy B. Schmit, Expando (Lost Highway, 2009)
 Ron Sexsmith, Forever Endeavour (Cooking Vinyl, 2013)
 Kevin Sharp, Measure of a Man (Asylum Records, 1996)
 Vonda Shepard, It's Good Eve (Vesperalley Records, 1996)
 Vonda Shepard, By 7:30 (Jacket Records, 1999)
 Vonda Shepard, From the Sun (Redeye, 2008)
 Chris Shiflett, Chris Shiflett & the Dead Peasants (RCA Records, 2010)
 The Smashing Pumpkins, Mellon Collie and the Infinite Sadness (Virgin Records, 1995)
 Jill Sobule, Dottie's Charms (Pinko, 2014)
 Ringo Starr, Give More Love (Universal Music Enterprises, 2017)
 Rod Stewart, Still the Same... Great Rock Classics of Our Time (J Records, 2006)
 Randy Stonehill, Return to Paradise (Myrrh Records, 1989)
 Peter Stuart, Propeller (Vanguard Records, 2002)
 Natalie D-Napoleon, Leaving Me Dry (Household Ink, 2012)
 Toad the Wet Sprocket, New Constellation (Abe's Records, 2013)
 Jack Tempchin and Richard Stekol, Live on Highway 101 (Night River, 2002)
 Teddy Thompson, Teddy Thompson (Virgin, 2000)
 Teddy Thompson, Upfront & Down Low (Verve Forecast, 2007)
 Pam Tillis, Sweetheart's Dance (Arista Records, 1994)
 Allen Toussaint, American Tunes (Nonesuch, 2016)
 Tremoloco, Dulcinea (Casa Julia Records, 2008)
 Shania Twain, Now (Mercury Nashville, 2017)
 St. Vincent, Masseduction (Loma Vista, 2017)
 St. Vincent, Daddy's Home (Loma Vista, 2021)
 Suzie Vinnick, Happy Here (self-released, 2008)
 Rufus Wainwright, Unfollow the Rules (BMG, 2020)
 Joe Walsh, Analog Man (Fantasy Records, 2012)
 Jennifer Warnes, The Well (Virgin Records, 2001)
 Jennifer Warnes, Another Time, Another Place (BMG, 2018)
 Was (Not Was), Boo! (Rykodisc, 2008)
 Sara Watkins, Sara Watkins (Nonesuch Records, 2009)
 Watkins Family Hour, Watkins Family Hour (Family Hour Records, 2015)
 Gillian Welch, Revival (Almo Sounds, 1996)
 Gillian Welch, Soul Journey (Acony, 2003)
 Paul Westerberg, Suicaine Gratifaction (Capitol Records, 1999)
 Whiskeytown, Stranger's Almanac (Geffen, 1997)
 The Williams Brothers, Harmony Hotel (Warner Bros. Records, 1993)
 Victoria Williams, Loose (Atlantic, 1994)
 Victoria Williams, Musings of a Creek Dipper (Atlantic, 1998)
 Victoria Williams, Water to Drink (Atlantic, 2000)
 Robbie Williams, Escapology (Chrysalis Records, 2002)
 Robbie Williams, Intensive Care (Chrysalis Records, 2005)
 Kelly Willis, Translated from Love (Rykodisc, 2007)
 Brian Wilson, Imagination (Giant, 1998)
 Brian Wilson, Gettin' In Over My Head (Brimel, 2004)
 Dan Wilson, Love Without Fear (Ballroom, 2014) 
 Lee Ann Womack, Something Worth Leaving Behind (MCA Nashville, 2002)
 Lizz Wright, Dreaming Wide Awake (Verve, 2005)
 Dwight Yoakam, Hillbilly Deluxe (Reprise, 1987)

References

External links

 
 

1949 births
Living people
Musicians from Buffalo, New York
American folk guitarists
American male guitarists
Steel guitarists
Pedal steel guitarists
Bon Iver members
American session musicians
20th-century American guitarists
20th-century American male musicians
Works Progress Administration (band) members